Deh-e Ahmad (also Romanized as Deh-e Aḩmad) is a village in Bahmayi-ye Sarhadi-ye Sharqi Rural District, Dishmok District, Kohgiluyeh County, Kohgiluyeh and Boyer-Ahmad Province, Iran. At the 2006 census, its population was 347, in 64 families.

References 

Populated places in Kohgiluyeh County